The Handball Federation of the Faroe Islands (HSF) is the administrative and controlling body for handball and beach handball in Faroe Islands. Founded in 1980, HSF is a member of European Handball Federation (EHF) and the International Handball Federation (IHF).

National teams
 Faroe Islands men's national handball team
 Faroe Islands men's national junior handball team
 Faroe Islands men's national youth handball team
 Faroe Islands women's national handball team

References

External links
 Official website  
 Faroe Islands at the IHF website.
 Faroe Islands at the EHF website.

Handball in the Faroe Islands
Handball
Sports organizations established in 1980
Faroe
Faroe
Faroe